Nippenburg, both the ruined castle built on a mountain spur overlooking the Glems river valley and the farming village it was constructed at, is located  and  from Stuttgart's city center near the town of Schwieberdingen. The oldest record of the Nippenburg's existence is from the Codex Hirsaugiensis of 1160, making it among the very oldest castles in the vicinity of Stuttgart. Today, all that remains of the castle is the high curtain wall and outer bailey, and a large barn built in 1483 thanks to a short lived effort in the early 1980s to restore these items.

History
The Nippenburg was built by a local family of Knights in the Twelfth Century, though it could have been originally built in the 9th Century.

In the 17th Century, the castle was positioned favorably: lying on a mountain spur over-half the Glems valley and built in direct proximity to the manor-house lock Nippenburg. In following centuries the castle was heavily quarried and abandoned. The ruins are with high walls and fortifications as well as a substantial scrub. In the 1980s, the building was partially restored to its 1483 condition.

Nippenburg Castle was probably built for military purposes in the 12th century by a local noble family. It is considered the oldest castle ruin in the Stuttgart area. The castle was first mentioned in documents in the Codex Hirsaugiensis, which testifies to a mill built by a berwart "below the Nippenburg" for 1160. In 1283, a prominent rendezvous took place at the Nippenburg: Guests of Frederick of Nippenburg (dictus Urrus de Nippenburc) were the Lower Swabian imperial bailiff Count Albrecht II. of Hohenberg, Count Eberhard I. of Württemberg, Count Konrad III. von Vaihingen and the provost Dietrich von Beutelsbach as well as numerous clergymen, noblemen and ministers mainly from the area between Sindelfingen and Pforzheim, who all testified to a comparison of the inheritance of the lords of Nippenburg and the lords of Enzberg around the castle Kapfenhart near Weissach.

The original castle complex of the lords of Nippenburg has been extended several times over the years. For example, the kennel in front of the curtain wall dates from the first half of the 14th century. The outer bailey with the massive barn still preserved today was built towards the end of the 15th century.

Due to the newly developed explosive projectiles and the resulting replacement of catapults with mortars and cannons, the castle complexes could no longer offer the inhabitants sufficient protection. Since the castles were only cold, wet and uncomfortable to live in, they were increasingly abandoned. Around 1600 the construction of the manor house Schloss Nippenburg above the castle complex was therefore begun, which was extended and altered in the 18th and 19th centuries.

When Wilhelm, the last knight of Nippenburg, built the manor house, he had stones broken out of the castle and used them as building material for his new manor house. After the castle itself was inhabited until about 1700, it was left to decay in the following centuries. At what point in time the castle was completely abandoned as a place of residence and protection cannot be exactly determined. For example, a stove plate from 1770 found during restoration work indicates that the castle was still partially inhabited later. However, correspondence between the bailiffs of Grueningen and Leonberg, who fought in 1647 and 1648 over well-preserved boards and beams of the Nippenburg, shows that parts of the buildings within the castle had already been abandoned at this time and that the remaining remains of the castle were used until it was finally only a ruin. Over time, ivy and shrubs covered the remains of the walls. Only the storerooms and storerooms of the castle were used by the inhabitants of the manor house for a long time.

In the 1960s and 1970s the plan to restore the desolate walls matured. To preserve the castle ruins, extensive restoration measures were carried out on the walls, which were in danger of collapsing, between 1979 and 1984. The costs for this were borne by the State Monument Office of Baden-Württemberg, the municipality of Schwieberdingen, the current owner, Count Leutrum, and the district of Ludwigsburg. Today the ruins of Nippenburg Castle are a popular destination for excursions.

See also
Golfanlage Golf Nippenburg

References

Notes

Footnotes

Citations

External links

 The Nippenburg on the website of the City of Schwieberdingen (German)
 The Nippenburg on www.burgenwelt.de (German)
 Homepage of the Schloss Nippenburg golf course (German)

Ruined castles in Germany